The 1992 Laurence Olivier Awards were held in 1992 in London celebrating excellence in West End theatre by the Society of London Theatre.

Winners and nominees
Details of winners (in bold) and nominees, in each award category, per the Society of London Theatre.

{| class=wikitable width="100%"
|-
! width="50%" | Play of the Year
! width="50%" | Best New Musical
|-
| valign="top" |
 Death and the Maiden by Ariel Dorfman – Royal Court / Duke of York's
 Angels in America by Tony Kushner – National Theatre Cottesloe
 The Madness of George III by Alan Bennett – National Theatre Lyttelton
 Three Birds Alighting on a Field by Timberlake Wertenbaker – Royal Court
| valign="top" |
 Carmen Jones – Old Vic
 The Phantom of the Opera – Shaftesbury
|-
! style="width="50%" | Best Revival of a Play or Comedy
! style="width="50%" | Best Musical Revival
|-
| valign="top" |
 Hedda Gabler – Playhouse
 Faith Healer – Royal Court
 The Comedy of Errors – RSC at the Barbican
 Uncle Vanya – National Theatre Cottesloe
| valign="top" |
 The Boys from Syracuse – Regent's Park Open Air
 Joseph and the Amazing Technicolor Dreamcoat – London Palladium
|-
! style="width="50%" | Best Comedy
! style="width="50%" | Best Entertainment
|-
| valign="top" |
 La Bête by David Hirson – Lyric Hammersmith
 An Evening with Gary Lineker by Chris England and Arthur Smith – Duchess
 It's Ralph by Hugh Whitemore – Comedy
| valign="top" |
 Talking Heads – Comedy
A Tribute to the Blues Brothers – Whitehall
 Kit and The Widow: Lavishly Mounted – Ambassadors
 Tango Argentino – Aldwych
|-
! style="width="50%" | Actor of the Year
! style="width="50%" | Actress of the Year
|-
| valign="top" |
 Nigel Hawthorne as George III in The Madness of George III – National Theatre Lyttelton
 Marcus D'Amico as Louis Ironson in Angels in America – National Theatre Cottesloe
 Robert Lindsay as Henry II in Becket – Theatre Royal Haymarket
 Ian McKellen as Vanya Petrovich Voynitsky in Uncle Vanya – National Theatre Cottesloe
| valign="top" |
 Juliet Stevenson as Paulina Salas in Death and the Maiden – Royal Court / Duke of York's
 Janet McTeer as Yelena Andreyevna Serebryakova in Uncle Vanya – National Theatre Cottesloe
 Patricia Routledge as Miss Schofield in Talking Heads – Comedy
 Fiona Shaw as Hedda Gabler Tesman in Hedda Gabler – Playhouse
|-
! style="width="50%" | Best Actor in a Musical
! style="width="50%" | Best Actress in a Musical
|-
| valign="top" |
 Alan Bennett as Graham Whittaker in Talking Heads – Comedy
 Philip Bird as Performer in Good Rockin' Tonite – Strand
 Jason Donovan as Joseph in Joseph and the Amazing Technicolor Dreamcoat – London Palladium
 Damon Evans as Joe in Carmen Jones – Old Vic
| valign="top" |
 Wilhelmenia Fernandez as Carmen Jones in Carmen Jones – Old Vic
 Sharon Benson as Carmen Jones in Carmen Jones – Old Vic
 Linzi Hateley as The Narrator in Joseph and the Amazing Technicolor Dreamcoat – London Palladium
 Miriam Margolyes as Various in Dickens' Women – Duke of York's
|-
! colspan=1| Best Comedy Performance
|-
|
 Desmond Barrit as Antipholus of Ephesus and Antipholus of Syracuse in The Comedy of Errors – RSC at the Barbican
 Robin Bailey as Ivan Vassilevich in Black Snow – National Theatre Cottesloe
 Alan Cumming as Valere in La Bête – Lyric Theatre Hammersmith
 Lia Williams as Karen Knightly in The Revengers' Comedies – Strand
|-
! style="width="50%" | Best Actor in a Supporting Role
! style="width="50%" | Best Actress in a Supporting Role
|-
| valign="top" |
 Oleg Menshikov as Sergei Yesenin in When She Danced – Globe
 Simon Russell Beale as Thersites in Troilus and Cressida – RSC at The Pit
 Henry Goodman as Roy Cohn in Angels in America – National Theatre Cottesloe
 Ken Stott as Sergeant Kite in The Recruiting Officer – National Theatre Olivier
| valign="top" |
 Frances de la Tour as Miss Belzer in When She Danced – Globe
 Eileen Atkins as Hannah Jelkes in The Night of the Iguana – National Theatre Lyttelton
 Clare Higgins as Amalia Jovine in Napoli milionaria – National Theatre Lyttelton
 Lesley Sharp as Sonya Alexandrovna Serebryakova in Uncle Vanya – National Theatre Cottesloe
|-
! colspan=1| Best Supporting Performance in a Musical
|-
|
 Jenny Galloway as Luce in The Boys from Syracuse – Regent's Park Open Air
 Gregg Baker as Frankie in Carmen Jones – Old Vic
 Karen Parks as Myrt in Carmen Jones – Old Vic
 Martin Smith as Soloist in A Swell Party – Vaudeville
|-
! style="width="50%" | Best Director of a Play
! style="width="50%" | Best Director of a Musical
|-
| valign="top" |
 Deborah Warner for Hedda Gabler – Playhouse
 Declan Donnellan for Angels in America – National Theatre Cottesloe
 Ian Judge for The Comedy of Errors – RSC at the Barbican
 Sean Mathias for Uncle Vanya – National Theatre Cottesloe
| valign="top" |
 Simon Callow for Carmen Jones – Old Vic
 Judi Dench for The Boys from Syracuse – Regent's Park Open Air
 Ken Hill for The Phantom of the Opera – Shaftesbury
 Steven Pimlott for Joseph and the Amazing Technicolor Dreamcoat – London Palladium
|-
! colspan=1| Best Theatre Choreographer
|-
|
 Rafael Aguilar for Matador – Queen's
Steven Berkoff for The Trial – National Theatre Lyttelton
 The ensemble for Tango Argentino – Aldwych
 Anthony Van Laast for Joseph and the Amazing Technicolor Dreamcoat – London Palladium
|-
! colspan=1| Best Set Designer
! colspan=1| Best Costume Designer
|-
| valign="top" |
 Mark Thompson for Joseph and the Amazing Technicolor Dreamcoat – London Palladium and The Comedy of Errors – RSC at the Barbican
 Bob Crowley for Murmuring Judges – National Theatre Olivier, The Night of the Iguana – National Theatre Lyttelton and When She Danced – Globe
 Ashley Martin-Davis for The Miser and The Recruiting Officer – National Theatre Olivier
 Philip Prowse for A Woman of No Importance – RSC at the Barbican and The White Devil – National Theatre Olivier
| valign="top" |
 Mark Thompson for The Comedy of Errors – RSC at the Barbican
 Ashley Martin-Davis for The Miser – National Theatre Olivier
 James Merifield for The Boys from Syracuse – Regent's Park Open Air
 Philip Prowse for A Woman of No Importance – RSC at the Barbican
|-
! colspan=1| Best Lighting Designer
|-
|
 Mark Henderson for Long Day's Journey into Night – National Theatre Lyttelton and Murmuring Judges – National Theatre Olivier
 Wayne Dowdeswell for Edward II – RSC at The Pit
 Jean Kalman for Hedda Gabler – Playhouse and The Night of the Iguana – National Theatre Lyttelton
 Sumio Yoshii for Tango at the End of Winter – Piccadilly
|-
! colspan=1| Outstanding Achievement of the Year in Dance
! colspan=2| Outstanding Achievement in Opera
|-
| valign="top" |
 William Forsythe for choreographing and performing in In the Middle, Somewhat Elevated, The Royal Ballet – Royal Opera House
 Adventures in Motion Pictures for most promising small dance company to present a West End season – Royal Court
 Christopher Gable for his vital and imaginative Romeo and Juliet, Northern Ballet Theatre – Royalty
 Phillipe Genty for his imaginative visual presentation, Driftings – Sadler's Wells
 Stephen Jefferies in Cyrano, The Royal Ballet – Royal Opera House
 Graham Lustig for choreographing and Henk Schut for set designing Inscape, Birmingham Royal Ballet – Royal Opera House
| valign="top" |
 Mitridate, re di Ponto, The Royal Opera – Royal Opera House
 Harrison Birtwistle in Gawain, The Royal Opera – Royal Opera House
 Simon Boccanegra, The Royal Opera – Royal Opera House
 Out of Season, English National Opera – London Coliseum
 Out of Season and The Dancer Hotoke, The Garden Venture – Riverside Studios
 Peter Grimes, English National Opera – London Coliseum
|-
! colspan=1| Award for Outstanding Achievement 
|-
|
 Damned for Despair and The Great Pretenders – Gate
 Steven Berkoff for writing Kvetch – Garrick
 Danny Boyle for producing The Last Days of Don Juan – RSC at the Barbican Pit
 Gaudeamus, Maly Theatre – London International Festival
 Vanessa Redgrave in When She Danced – Globe
 Bandō Tamasaburō V whose grace and poetry delighted audiences including his world-famous representation of a maiden transformed into a dying heron in a snowstorm, Japan Festival – National Theatre
|-
! colspan=1| Society Special Award
|-
|
 Ninette de Valois'|}

Productions with multiple nominations and awards
The following 18 productions received multiple nominations:

 7: Carmen Jones 6: Joseph and the Amazing Technicolor Dreamcoat 5: The Comedy of Errors and Uncle Vanya 4: Angels in America, Hedda Gabler, The Boys from Syracuse and When She Danced 3: Talking Heads and The Night of the Iguana 2: A Woman of No Importance, Death and the Maiden, Murmuring Judges, Tango Argentino, The Madness of George III, The Miser, The Phantom of the Opera and The Recruiting OfficerThe following eight productions received multiple awards:

 3: Carmen Jones and The Comedy of Errors 2: Death and the Maiden, Hedda Gabler, La Bête, Talking Heads, The Boys from Syracuse and When She Danced''

See also
 46th Tony Awards

References

External links
 Previous Olivier Winners – 1992

Laurence Olivier Awards ceremonies
Laurence Olivier Awards, 1992
Laurence Olivier Awards
Laurence Olivier Awards